The Brazilian Federal Railroad Police (US English) or Federal Railway Police (British English) is a police agency founded in 1852 which is responsible for patrols and security on federal railways in Brazil. According to Federal Marshalls, the Federal Railway Police don't have work force, its name still remains, even without practical use. As of 2021, a bill is in course to promote the Railway Police and turn its creation effective.

History 

This agency was created in 1852, by decree of the emperor Dom Pedro II being the oldest police agency on Brazil. Was created to protect all riches that were carried on iron rails. There are some proposals in the Brazilian Senate to reactivate this police agency, as it is considered important to national security. With the considerable amount of railway lines in Brazil being privatized in 1996, the function of this agency has become even more limited, leading to their gradual disappearance.

Federal Constitution 

The Brazilian Constitution of 1988 brings in its article 144, paragraph 3º, a text where it mentions and it regularizes the presence of this institution: § 3º - the federal railway police,  permanent agency, organized and maintained by the Union and structured in career, is intended, in the law format, to the ostensible patrolling of the federal railroads.

See also
 Brazilian Federal Police
 Military Police of Brazilian States
 Policing in Brazil
 Civil Police of Brazilian States
 Brazilian Federal Highway Police
 National Force

Notes and references

External links
 History of the Federal Railroad Police
 STIVE - Site on Public Security
 BNDS Privatization in Brazil 1990-2002

1852 establishments in Brazil
Rail transport in Brazil
Federal law enforcement agencies of Brazil
Government agencies established in 1852
Railroad police agencies